List of archaeological sites in County Fermanagh, Northern Ireland:

 

A
Aghaherrish, Counterscarp rath, grid ref: H1312 4467
Aghahoorin, Bivallate rath, grid ref: H1185 4573
Aghakillymaud, Court tomb, grid ref: H2730 3097
Aghalane Castle, in Killycloghan townland, grid ref: H3410 2000
Aghaleague, Counterscarp rath, grid ref: H2338 6448
Aghameelan, Two standing stones, grid ref: H0876 5509
Aghanaglack, Dual court tomb: Giant’s Grave, grid ref: H0981 4358
Aghanaglack, Cashel, grid ref: H1113 4361
Aghanaglack, Cave adapted for use as a Souterrain, grid ref: H1085 4357
Aghanaglack, Cross-shaft and base, grid ref: H1083 4351
Aghatirourke, Platform rath, grid ref: H1708 3237
Aghatirourke, Standing stone, grid ref: H1702 3225
Aghatirourke, Pre-historic enclosure, grid ref: H1692 3196
Annaghmore Glebe, Cairn kerb: Druid’s Temple, grid ref: H4266 2007
Ardshankill, Bivallate rath, grid ref: H1048 6330
Ardvarny East, Counterscarp rath, grid ref: H2229 6363
Ardvarny West, Stone cross head, grid ref: H2128 6363

B
Ballygonnell & Rabron, Rath, grid ref: H1850 4804
Ballyhill, Rath, church (site of) and graveyard, grid ref: H3927 4364
Ballyreagh, Dual court tomb: Giant’s Graves, grid ref: H3145 5041
Ballyreagh, Standing stones, grid ref: H3137 5864
Banagher, Rath, grid ref: H1935 4758
Beagho, Platform rath, grid ref: H3118 4137
Beihy, Court tomb, grid ref: H1603 3044
Beihy, Multiple cist cairn, grid ref: H1727 3108
Bigwood (Drumkeeran), Bivallate rath, grid ref: H1251 6687
Black Pig's Dyke, Part of linear earthwork, in Lislea townland, grid ref: H4836 2706
Black Pig's Dyke, in Mullynavannoge townland, grid ref: H4838 2631 – H4850 2590
Boa Island, Counterscarp rath, Dreenan townland, grid ref: H0744 6250
Boa Island, Carved stones, graveyard and enclosure, Dreenan townland, grid ref: H0852 6197
Braade, Sweat house, grid ref: H0540 5472
Breagho, Possible megalithic tomb, grid ref: H2673 4867
Brookhill, Counterscarp rath, grid ref: H0770 6498
Brougher, Megalith and alignment, grid ref: H3579 5285
Bunnahone Lough, Crannogs (3), in Lenaghan townland, grid ref: Area of H100 553

C
Carney Hill, Platform rath, grid ref: H2247 3834
Carnirk, Rath, grid ref: H0910 5474
Carrick Church, Church and graveyard, Aghamore townland, grid ref: H0962 5388
Carrick Lough, Crannog, in Largalinny townland, grid ref: H0949 5398
Carrickmacflaherty & Drumman, Court tomb: Giant’s Grave, grid ref: H1072 4086
Carrickmacsparrow, Court tomb: Giant’s Grave, grid ref: H1382 4058
Carrigan, Souterrain: St Lasser’s Cell, grid ref: H1235 3541
Castle Caldwell, in Rossbeg townland, grid ref: H0175 6057
Castle Coole, 17th century house (site of), bawn (site of) and formal garden, grid ref: H2574 4333
Cavancarragh, Standing stone alignments, grid ref: H2990 4495
Cavancarragh, Possible megalithic tomb, grid ref: H2997 4496
Cavantillycormick, Rath, grid ref: H2752 5035
Cavantillycormick, Dual court tomb: Giant’s Grave, grid ref: H2885 4956
Clareview, Standing stone, grid ref: H 1705 6132
Cleenish (Island), Church (site of) and carved stones in graveyard, grid ref: H2550 3964
Cloghagaddy, Standing stone: Leagaun, grid ref: H4305 3022
Cloghanagh, Burnt mound, grid ref: H1773 4555
Cloghcor, Cairn kerb (‘Stone circle’), grid ref: H2954 4055
Cloghtogle, Wedge tomb: Giant’s Grave or Druid’s Altar, grid ref: H3187 4422
Cloghtogle, Rath, grid ref: H3171 4417
Clonbunniagh, Rath, grid ref: H2107 3985
Clyhannagh, Cup marked stone, grid ref: H1063 3564
Clyhannagh, Dual court tomb, grid ref: H1069 3548
Coagh, Barrow, grid ref: H2065 4840
Concaroe, Rath, grid ref: H1756 4994
Coolbuck, Standing stone, grid ref: H3093 4394
Coolbuck, Cairn, grid ref: H3106 4387
Coolbuck, Wedge tomb: Druid’s Altar and Giant’s Grave, grid ref: H3099 4386
Coolbuck, Court tomb, grid ref: H3108 4335
Coolbuck, Rath, grid ref: H3130 4331
Coolisk, Rath, grid ref: H1953 5886
Corlatt, Counterscarp rath, grid ref: H4013 2543
Cornacully, Court tomb: Giant’s Grave, grid ref: H0215 4543
Cornashee, Mound, cairn, enclosures and henge, grid ref: H3668 3479
Corraderrybrock, Concentric stone circles, grid ref: H0308 4374
Corraghy, Sweat house, grid ref: H4646 3320
Corragunt, Sweat house, grid ref: H5252 3804
Corraleek, Sweat house, grid ref: H5255 3740
Corratrasna, Court tomb: Giant’s Grave, grid ref: H2787 2977
Corratrasna, Fortified manor house, grid ref: H2787 3004
Corry, Bivallate rath, grid ref: G9278 5831
Corry, Rath, grid ref: H3160 2158
Crevenish, Castle, grid ref: H1655 6260
Crom Castle and garden: Crom Old Castle, grid ref: H3645 2380
Crom Cruaich, Standing stone, Drumcoo townland, grid ref: H0835 3921
Crott, Rath, grid ref: H1452 4724
Cruninish Island, Ring barrow, grid ref: H1225 6239
Cullen, Counterscarp rath, grid ref: H1701 5016
Cullentragh, Cashel, grid ref: H0847 3604
Currin, Bivallate rath, grid ref: H3540 4227

D
Derrybrusk Church, Church, Fyagh townland, grid ref: H2771 3913 
Derrycallaghan, Counterscarp rath, grid ref: H3010 3550
Derrygonnelly, Dunbar manor plantation castle, grid ref: H11871 52475
Derrygonnelly, 17th century church, grid ref: H1208 5240
Derryharvey, Barrow and burnt cemetery mounds, grid ref: H298 365
Derrykerrib, Mound, grid ref: H4157 2046
Derryvary Beg & Newtown, rath with annexe, grid ref: H1316 5008
Derryvullan, Ecclesiastical site,  grid ref: H2743 4038
Devenish Island, Rath, grid ref: H2215 4768
Devenish Island, Monastic site (area surrounding the state care monument), grid ref: H224 469
Digh, Lough, Crannog, in Kinmore townland, grid ref: H3251 3332 
Diviny, Bivallate rath, H2455 6513
Doagh Glebe, Promontory fort, grid ref: H07090 51350
Donegall rath, grid ref: H1752 4657
Doohatty Glebe, Court tomb: Giant’s Grave, grid ref: H1848 3112
Doon, Two stones with cup-marks and decoration: the Gray Stone, grid ref: H3451 4685
Doonan, Rath, grid ref: H1913 5706
Doonan, Rath, grid ref: H1908 5692
Dresternan, Rath, grid ref: H0977 5440
Dromore Big, Court tomb: Giant’s Grave, grid ref: H1708 7055
Drumadillar, Rath, grid ref: H1239 5210
Drumaran Fort, Rath, Drumaran townland, grid ref: H1857 5819
Drumary, Rath, grid ref: H1025 5429
Drumawillan, Round cairn, grid ref: H1203 3870
Drumbarna, Standing stone, grid ref: H1739 6125
Drumbrughas, Stone cross, grid ref: H4969 3260
Drumbrughas East, Fortification – castle, grid ref: H3940 2450
Drumcorban & Castletown Monea, Crannog, grid ref: H1646 4926
Drumcramph, Platform rath, grid ref: H3195 3631
Drumcrin, Rath, grid ref: H2217 5776
Drumcullion, Standing stone, grid ref: H2488 5113
Drumcurren, Burnt mound, grid ref: H1693 6584
Drumgay Lough, Crannogs (4), Conerick, Drumgay, Gortaloughan and Rakeelan Glebe townlands, grid ref: H244 477
Drummee, Rath, grid ref: H2072 4442
Drumnarullagh, Standing stone, grid ref: H1822 6400
Drumsawna More, Rath and bullauns (2), grid ref: H2513 6523
Drumsillagh, Rath, grid ref: H1969 4669
Drumsillagh, Rath, grid ref: H1974 4613
Dumbies (The), Court tomb, in Kilnameel townland, grid ref: H0912 3413

E
Enaghan, Rath, grid ref: H1713 4986
Eyes, Lough, Crannogs (6), in townlands of Magonrath, Coolbuck, Derryhoney, Drumlone and Shanco, grid ref: Area of H325 433

F
Farrancassidy, Mound, grid ref: G9524 5614
Faugher, Burnt mound, grid ref: H1719 4647
Formil, Stone circle and alignments, grid ref: H1588 6758

G
Galloon, Church (site of), graveyard, two cross-shafts and bases, grid ref: H3907 2266
Glasmullagh, Rath, grid ref: H3227 2237
Glengesh, Portal tomb: Giant’s Grave, grid ref: H3905 5438
Glennasheevar, Sweat house, grid ref: H0390 5336
Golan, Rath, grid ref: H4381 3029
Gorteen, Barrow and cist (otherwise known as Danes fort), grid ref: H0803 3926
Gortmaconnell, Platform rath, grid ref: H1305 3413
Greenan, Wedge tomb: Giant’s Grave, grid ref: H1721 2923

I
Inishkeen, Church and graveyard, cross-shaft and base, grid ref: H2478 4127
Inishmacsaint (Island), Penannular enclosure, grid ref: H1653 5428
Inishmacsaint (Island), Area of 5.84 acres, including former enclosure of monastic site, grid ref: H165 541
Inishmacsaint (Island), Enclosure: unconsecrated graveyard, grid ref: H1649 5410
Inishmacsaint (Island), Barrow: Moat of Inis, grid ref: H1637 5440
Inishmore (or Davy’s Island), Church and enclosure, grid ref: H1741 5933

K
Keenaghan, Possible megalithic tomb, grid ref: G9634 5951
Keeran, Wedge tomb: Giant’s Grave, grid ref: H239 6146
Kevenagh, Rath, grid ref: H3869 2369
Killadeas graveyard, carved stones (4), in Rockfield townland, grid ref: H2063 5399
Killesher, Church and graveyard, grid ref: H1222 3583
Killy Beg, Two megalithic tombs ‘The Giant’s Graves’, grid ref: G9854 5386
Killy Beg, Wedge tomb: Giant’s Grave, grid ref: G9816 5416
Killy Beg, Standing stones (2), grid ref: G9821 5423
Killy Beg, Wedge tomb: Giant’s Grave, grid ref: G9823 5416
Killy Beg, Standing stones (5), G9827 5424
Killykeeghan, Cashel, grid ref: H1025 3426
Killykeeghan, Enclosure and cup and ring marked stone, grid ref: H1074 3411 and H1083 3406
Killykeeghan, Cashel, grid ref: H1087 3379
Killykeeghan, Cashel, grid ref: H1094 3421
Killyvannan, Platform rath, grid ref: H2864 4007
Kilrooskagh, Megalith: portal tomb, grid ref: H0614 3998
Kilrooskagh, Cashel, grid ref: H0561 3950
Kiltierney, Passage tomb and ring cairn, grid ref: H21706267
Kiltierney and Tullanaglug, Linear earthwork: the Friar’s Walk, grid ref: H214 624 to H217 630
Kiltierney, Abbey, graveyard and holy well, grid ref: H2220 6266 and H2223 6263
Kiltierney, Ecclesiastical enclosure (additional area), grid ref: H2220 6265
Kiltierney, Holy well: Tobernasool, grid ref: H2186 6261
Kiltierney, Earthwork, grid ref: H2165 6238
Kiltierney, Barrow, grid ref: H2175 6246
Kiltober, Mound, holy well and penitential stones, H4285 2230
Kinarla, Burnt mound, grid ref: H2123 4553
Kinarla, Burnt mound, grid ref: H2080 4515
Kinawley Church, in Lismonaghan townland, grid ref: H2297 3080
Knock Beg, Henge, grid ref: H0813 5045
Knock More, Cave with rock scribings: ‘Lettered Cave’, grid ref: H0884 5047
Knockennis, Court tomb: Giant’s Graves, grid ref: H3935 5409
Knockninny, Dual court tomb, grid ref: H2709 3050

L
Lanmore, Rath, grid ref: H1403 3480
Laragh, Platform rath, grid ref: H2435 3147
Largy, Stone circle (remains of) and standing stone, grid ref: H2929 4668
Leglehid, Rath, grid ref: G9614 5170
Legmacaffrey, Fundamental bench mark, grid ref: H4398 2549
Legnagay Beg, Rath, grid ref: H1116 4380
Legnagay Beg, Rath, grid ref: H1131 4380
Lergan, Sweat house, grid ref: G9738 5639
Letterbailey, Stone circle, grid ref: H3646 5164
Letterboy, Counterscarp rath, grid ref: H2074 6456
Letterbreen, Platform rath, grid ref: H1707 4015
Lisblake, Counterscarp rath, grid ref: H1648 3586
Lislea, Large hilltop enclosure, grid ref: H4803 2680
Lismalore, Rath, grid ref: H3927 4103
Lisnagole, Rath, grid ref: H3489 3649
Lisnamallard, Henge, grid ref: H4351 3014
Lissan, Dual court tomb: Druid’s Circle, grid ref: H2758 4702
Lissan, Standing stone, grid ref: H2675 4674

M
Macnean Lower, Lough, Mound, grid ref: H1004 3774
Macnean Lower, Lough, Crannogs (4), grid refs: H0980 3716, H0786 3876, H1141 3705 and H1204 3743
Magheradunbar, Burial ground/enclosure, grid ref: H19950 46660
Magherahar, Bivallate rath, grid ref: H1618 5154
Meenagleragh, Wedge tomb: Giant’s Grave, grid ref: H0235 5100
Millwood, Platform rath, grid ref: H3202 4119
Monavreece, Rath, grid ref: H2253 6610
Monavreece, Mound, grid ref: H2251 6597
Monea, Cist burial, grid ref: H1561 4932
Monea Castle, Avenue and gardens, Castletown Monea townland,  grid ref: H1647 4937
Moneendogue, Counterscarp rath, G9301 5729
Montiaghroe, Stone alignment, grid ref: H1932 6944
Montiaghroe, Stone circle, grid ref: H1936 6932
Montiaghroe, Stone alignment, grid ref: H1971 6902
Mountdrum, Prehistoric ritual landscape, grid ref: Area of H308 432
Mount Sedborough Lough, Crannog, in Dernaclug and Drumaa townlands, grid ref: H4452 3086
Moylehid, Passage tomb: Giant’s Grave or Eables’ Knoll Cairn, grid ref: H1499 4161
Moylehid, Ring cairn, grid ref: H1510 4154
Moynaghan South, Ring barrow, grid ref: H2041 5528
Mullaghbane, Counterscarp rath, grid ref: H0941 3784
Mullaghbane, Rath, grid ref: H0936 3737
Mullaghsillogagh, Raths (2), grid ref: H4269 5073 and H4287 5040
Mullan, Sweat house, grid ref: H0429 4091
Mullan and Meenawargy, Cashel and mass rock: Cashelbane, grid ref: H0448 4121
Mullanacaw, Earthwork, grid ref: H2190 4380
Mullies, Counterscarp rath, grid ref: H1813 5790
Mullyknock, Barrow, grid ref: H3244 4589

R
Rahallan, Bivallate rath, grid ref: H1498 3978
Rahalton, Rath, grid ref: H1386 5364
Rahalton and Corbystown, Rath, grid ref: H1421 5394
Ratoran, Stone alignment, grid ref: H3529 4655
Reyfad, Decorated stones, grid ref: H1120 4615
Ring Burnt mound/cooking place, grid ref: H2745 3855
Roosky, Rath, grid ref: H1361 5271
Ross Lough, Crannog, in Ross townland, grid ref: H1429 4677
Rossinure Beg, Court tomb: Giant’s Grave, grid ref: H0691 5053
Rossinure More, Court tomb: Giant’s Grave, grid ref: H0771 5039
Rossmore, Round cairn: Black Fort, grid ref: H0149 58863
Rossorry, Rectangular enclosure, grid ref: H2318 4288
Rossorry, Ecclesiastical site, grid ref: H2311 4293
Rushin, Church: Templerushin at Holywell, grid ref: H0757 3967

S
Scandally, Raths (2), grid refs: H1433 5142 and H1508 5115
Shean, Rath, grid ref: H0912 5766
Sheebeg, Henge, rath and barrow, grid ref: Area of H369 341
Sheemuldoon, Wedge tomb: Giant’s Grave, grid ref: H2659 6261
Skaghlea Cairn, Court tomb, Dog Little townland, grid ref: H0198 5070
Slattinagh and Frevagh, Monastic site with cross-shaft and base: Kilcoo, grid ref: Area of G967 465
Slisgarrow, Standing stones (3), H0121 9512

T
Tattycam Lough, Crannog, in Rateen and Tattycam townlands, grid ref: H4405 3100
Tawnydorragh, Court tomb: Giant’s Grave, grid ref: 1911 7308
Teesnaghtan, Cross-inscribed standing stone and 2 cairns, grid ref: H1925 3064
Templemoyle, Church and enclosure, Gortahurk West townland, grid ref: H1315 3960
Templenaffrin, Church, graveyard and enclosure, grid ref: H1007 3881
Tievealough, Church, grid ref: G9777 5984
Tiraltan, Rath, grid ref: H3318 4559
Toneel North, Cross-shaft and base: Boho Cross, grid ref: H1165 4618
Tonyloman, Rath, grid ref: H2329 3806
Tonyvarnog, Cashel, H2600 2893
Topped Mountain or Mullyknock, Round cairn, H3114 4575
Trannish (Island), Artillery fort, grid ref: H3284 2967
Treel, Rath, grid ref: H1246 4350
Tullanaglug and Kiltierney, Linear earthwork: the Friar’s Walk, grid ref: H214 624 to H217 630
Tullanaglug, Barrows (2) and section of Friar’s Walk, grid ref: H2152 6260
Tully, Court tomb, grid ref: H1257 5615
Tully, Abbey (traditional site), grid ref: H1232 5689
Tullycallrick, Counterscarp rath, H2106 6228
Tullykelter Castle, castle, Tullykelter townland, grid ref: H1550 4830
Tullymargy, Rath pair, grid refs: H1647 4798 and H1650 4792

W
White Island, Rath, earthwork and area surrounding the state care monument, grid ref: H1753 6000

References
The main reference for all sites listed is: NI Environment Agency, Scheduled Historic Monuments (to 15 October 2012), unless otherwise indicated.

 
Fermanagh
County Fermanagh
Archaeological